William Croft was a musician.

William Croft may also refer to:

William Croft (linguist)
William Denman Croft, British Army officer
Sir William Croft (civil servant), English civil servant
William Croft (MP) for Launceston (UK Parliament constituency)
William Croft (Canadian politician) in Toronto municipal election, 1939

See also
William Crofts (disambiguation)